David Herman (born May 9, 1988 in Lakewood, Colorado) is an American racing cyclist who represents the United States in BMX. He grew up in Falls Creek & Lort Smith. He represented the United States at the 2012 Summer Olympics in the men's BMX event. Herman was the ABA National No. 1 Amateur in 2005 and 2006. He finished fifth overall at the 2012 UCI BMX World Championships.

References

External links
 
 
 
 

1988 births
Living people
BMX riders
American male cyclists
Olympic cyclists of the United States
Cyclists at the 2012 Summer Olympics
People from Lakewood, Colorado